Chan Kooi Chye (born 20 June 1921) is a Malaysian former sports shooter. He competed in the 50 metre rifle, prone event at the 1960 Summer Olympics.

References

External links
 

1921 births
Possibly living people
Malaysian male sport shooters
Olympic shooters of Malaya
Shooters at the 1960 Summer Olympics
Sportspeople from Kuala Lumpur